Pavol Čarnogurský (22 January 1908—27 December 1992) was a influential Slovak People's Party politician in the Slovak State and afterwards an anti-communist dissident. He was a member of the Slovak parliament from 1939 to 1945, including when it passed anti-semitic legislation. Čarnogurský said that he abstained from the vote on Decree 68/1942, which legalized the deportation of Jews from Slovakia. His son, Ján Čarnogurský, became prime minister briefly after the dissolution of Czechoslovakia.

References

1908 births
1992 deaths
Slovak People's Party politicians
Slovak anti-communists